24th Street Mission station is a Bay Area Rapid Transit (BART) station located under Mission Street at 24th Street in the Mission District of San Francisco, California.

Station layout 
24th Street Mission station has two escalator and stair banks at the northeast and southwest corners of the intersection, which lead to a mezzanine under the intersection. A single row of fare gates connects to a vaulted paid mezzanine centered over the platform area. The station has a single island platform serving two tracks. 16th Street Mission station has an identical design. Both stations have concrete reliefs by William Mitchell on the walls of their entrances, as well as colorful tilework on the mezzanine and platform levels.

History 
Service at the station began on November 5, 1973.

BART began planning a renovation of the southwest entrance plaza in 2001. The $4.2 million project broke ground in April 2013 and was completed in January 2014.

From September 20, 2020, to March 21, 2021, and from August 2, 2021, 24th Street Mission became the terminal for Dublin/Pleasanton–Daly City line trains during single-tracking work on some Sundays.

On July 20, 2022, BART temporarily fenced off the plazas at the station for a planned 60 days, while retaining access to the station. The closure was requested by San Francisco Supervisor Hillary Ronen in response to reported selling of stolen goods at the plazas.

References

External links 

Bay Area Rapid Transit stations in San Francisco
Stations on the Yellow Line (BART)
Stations on the Green Line (BART)
Stations on the Red Line (BART)
Stations on the Blue Line (BART)
Mission District, San Francisco
Railway stations in the United States opened in 1973
1973 establishments in California